Nickelodeon Launch Box is an educational television series that was produced jointly by Nickelodeon, NASA and the Astronauts Memorial Foundation. It was meant to teach kids about space travel technology. As part of the Cable in the Classroom service, the show was intended to be taped by teachers and shown in the classroom. Each episode also included a teachers portion before and after where ideas for lessons and other aides were discussed. The show was taped before a live studio audience at Nickelodeon Studios and made use of many sets for Nickelodeon shows such as What Would You Do? and Double Dare.

The show aired on Nickelodeon from May 9, 1991 to March 11, 1994, and continued in reruns often in early morning time slots right after Nick at Nite had finished (usually as part of Cable in the Classroom) until September 1, 2000.

Episodes

References

1990s Nickelodeon original programming
Astronomy education television series
1990s American children's television series
1991 American television series debuts
1994 American television series endings
Joint ventures
American children's education television series
Television shows filmed in Florida